was a professor of Tokyo University of Science. He coined the term  nano-technology in 1974 to describe semiconductor processes such as thin film deposition and ion beam milling exhibiting characteristic control on the order of a nanometer: "Nano-technology' mainly consists of the processing of separation, consolidation, and deformation of materials by one atom or one molecule."

Taniguchi started his research on abrasive mechanisms of high precision machining of hard and brittle materials.  At Tokyo University of Science, he went on to pioneer the application of energy beam techniques to ultra precision materials processing; these included electro discharge, microwave, electron beam, photon (laser) and ion beams.

He studied the developments in machining techniques from 1940 until the early 1970s and predicted correctly that by the late 1980s, techniques would have evolved to a degree that dimensional accuracies of better than 100 nm would be achievable.

Recognition 
The European Society for Precision Engineering and Nanotechnology presented Professor Taniguchi with its 1st Lifetime Achievement Award in Bremen, May 1999. 

The citation on Professor Taniguchi's award read:

References

Nanotechnology: Integrated Processing Systems for Ultra-precision and Ultra-fine products, Edited by Norio Taniguchi. Associate Editors: Tsuguo Kohno, Kazuo Maruyama, Kiyoshi Iizuka, Iwao Miyamoto and Toshio Dohi. 0198562837, hardback,  424 pages, Sep 1996.

1912 births
1999 deaths
Japanese scientists